Mall of America (MOA) is a large shopping mall located in Bloomington, Minnesota, United States. Located within the Minneapolis–Saint Paul metropolitan area, the mall lies southeast of the junction of Interstate 494 and Minnesota State Highway 77, north of the Minnesota River, and across the Interstate from the Minneapolis–Saint Paul International Airport. It opened in 1992, and is the largest mall in the United States, the largest in the Western Hemisphere, and the eleventh largest shopping mall in the world.

The mall is managed by the Triple Five Group (which in turn is owned by the Ghermezian family, along with the West Edmonton Mall and the American Dream). Approximately 40 million people visit the mall annually, 80% of whom are from Minnesota, Wisconsin, Iowa, Nebraska, the Dakotas, Illinois and Ohio.

In addition to the inside of the mall, outside of the mall are additional hotels, kiosks, restaurants, and stores. The Mall of America and the additional businesses meet at the South Loop District in Bloomington.

History
The mall's concept was designed by the Triple Five Group in conjunction with global design firm DLR Group, owned by the Ghermezian brothers, who also own the largest shopping mall in North America, the West Edmonton Mall. The Mall of America is located on the site of the former Metropolitan Stadium, where the Minnesota Vikings and Minnesota Twins played until the Hubert H. Humphrey Metrodome opened in 1982. A plaque in the mall's amusement park commemorates the former location of home plate and one seat from Met Stadium was placed in Mall of America at the exact location it occupied in the stadium, commemorating a  home run hit by hall-of-famer Harmon Killebrew on June 3, 1967.

In 1986, the Bloomington Port Authority signed an agreement with the Ghermezian organization. Groundbreaking for the mall took place on June 14, 1989. Organizations involved include Melvin Simon and Associates, Teachers Insurance and Annuity, and the office of architect Jon Jerde.

Mall of America opened its doors to the public on August 11, 1992. Its anchors were Nordstrom, Macy's, Bloomingdale's and Sears. Even before opening, the mall had earned several nicknames, including "The Megamall", "Sprawl of America", "Hugedale" in reference to the four major "dale" shopping malls within the Twin Cities: Rosedale, Southdale, Ridgedale and the now-defunct Brookdale.

Mall of America became the largest shopping mall in total area and largest in total store vendors in the United States when it opened. The Mall of America's 42 million annual visitors equal roughly eight times the population of the state of Minnesota. , the mall employed over 11,000 workers year-round and 13,000 during peak seasons.

On September 4, 1995, the mall hosted the first episode of WCW Monday Nitro.

In early 2020, Mall of America closed for a period of twelve weeks in response to the COVID-19 pandemic, closing on March 17, and reopening on June 10 with only 150 tenants open for business. The mall was originally scheduled to reopen on June 1, but civil unrest in the Twin Cities around this time caused the mall to postpone the reopening.

Legal battle 
In 2003, after a protracted six-year legal battle between Simon Property Group, the managing general partner of the property, and the Ghermezian brothers/Triple Five Group, over majority ownership of the site, a federal appeals court ruled in favor of the Ghermezians, effectively transferring control and planning authority of the mall back to the creator of the concept. The dispute stemmed from a 1999 purchase of Teacher's Insurance's 27.5% equity stake by Simon Properties, giving them majority ownership. The Ghermezians claimed they were never told of the deal and sued Simon, citing fiduciary responsibility. On November 3, 2006, the Ghermezians gained full control of Mall of America by spending US$1 billion.

Expansions 

On May 18, 2008, the Mall of America received a tax break for a proposed $2 billion expansion. The bill gave the city of Bloomington the ability to increase taxes on sales, lodging and food and beverages to finance a parking ramp at the mall. On March 24, 2012, the Triple Five Group, partnered with architectural firm DLR Group, announced the start of a $200 million expansion that would build into the north parking lot of the mall. The plans called for an additional hotel and an additional  of retail space. The project broke ground in the fall of 2013 and began opening in stages in the summer of 2015. In March 2014, ground was broken on the mall's north side for the $104 million, 14-story JW Marriott hotel, owned and financed by the Shakopee Mdewakanton Sioux Community. In 2018, it was announced that MOA had proposed to build an indoor water park, with a cost between $150 to $200 million for the project. In March 2022, the plan was approved by the Bloomington City Council.

Architecture

The mall is nearly symmetric, with a roughly rectangular floor plan. More than 500 stores are arranged along 3 levels of pedestrian walkways on the sides of the rectangle, with a 4th level on the east side. 4 anchor department stores are located at the corners. The mall is organized into 4 different zones. Each of those zones had its own decorative style until a series of renovations from 2010 to 2015 led to a unified and more luxurious style, as well as to coincide with the mall's first major expansion. The mall's food court is on the 3rd floor.

Despite Minnesota's cold winters, only the mall's entrances and some below ground areas are heated. Heat is allowed in through skylights above the central amusement park area. The majority of the heat is produced by lighting fixtures, other electric devices and people in the mall. In fact, even during the winter, air conditioning systems may still be in use during peak hours to ensure a comfortable shopping environment. Although the common areas are unheated, the individual stores do have heating systems.

Two nearly identical seven-story parking ramps on the east and west sides of the mall provide 12,287 parking spaces. Overflow parking north of the building provides an additional 1,200–1,500 spaces and 1,407 spaces are provided by IKEA, which opened in July 2004.

Tenants
During its run as an all-encompassing entertainment and retail venue, certain aspects, particularly its bars, have come under scrutiny. In early 2000, a Mardi Gras-themed bar, Fat Tuesday, shut its doors due to indecent exposure and alcohol-related offenses. On November 29, 2011, Google announced indoor maps for Mall of America along with several other places like airports, parks, and public spaces. On January 3, 2012, Macy's Inc. announced it would close its Bloomingdale's location at the Mall of America after nearly two decades.

The Theatres at Mall of America opened three days after the grand opening of the mall. Initially, the cinema was run by General Cinemas, but it was bought out then rebranded by AMC Theatres, and eventually operated by mall management. The cinema occupied the south side of the fourth floor through December 2016, when it closed permanently. It was replaced by Cinemex subsidiary CMX Cinemas in late 2017. Due to CMX Cinema's bankruptcy proceedings, CMX Mall of America closed down and replaced with B&B Theatres in 2021.

On December 28, 2018, it was announced that Sears (which had been at the Mall of America since its opening in 1992) would be closing as part of a plan to close 80 stores nationwide.

There are also junior anchors, including L.L. Bean, Barnes & Noble, DSW, and Marshalls. Former stores included Best Buy and American Girl, with the latter being replaced with a 24,000-square-foot M&M's retail store, which opened in late 2020.

Other
 JW Marriott Minneapolis Mall of America
 Mystic Lake Casino Hotel
 Radisson Blu Hotel

Attractions

Nickelodeon Universe, formerly Camp Snoopy, is an indoor theme park in the center of the mall. The park features roller coasters, among numerous other rides and attractions, including many not related to Nickelodeon, and is the largest indoor theme park in the United States. The rides include the roller coasters SpongeBob SquarePants Rock Bottom Plunge, Fairly Odd Coaster, Back at the Barnyard Hayride and Avatar Airbender, and a thrill ride called BrainSurge. It also has a miniature golfing section called Moose Mountain. This miniature golf course features eighteen holes and a relatively fast astroturf surface.

At the Sea Life Minnesota Aquarium, guests travel through a  curved tunnel through  of water to view over 4,500 sea creatures including sharks, turtles, stingrays and many more. Sea Life Minnesota Aquarium offers special events such as sleepovers, scuba diving, snorkeling and birthday parties.

Nostalgic artifacts and memorials
A stadium seat commemorating the longest home run at Metropolitan Stadium, hit by Minnesota Twins player Harmon Killebrew on June 3, 1967. The seat is painted red and bolted to a wall to mark the exact height and position at which the ball landed in the upper-deck seats.
A plaque embedded in the floor of Nickelodeon Universe, marking the exact spot of home plate at Metropolitan Stadium. 
A second plaque was added to the floor of Nickelodeon Universe in 2018, marking the spot on the 50-yard line at Metropolitan Stadium that was used for the coin toss before every Minnesota Vikings home game played there.
The United Airlines Flight 93 memorial, for those who died aboard during the September 11 attacks. The bust of Tom Burnett (who was born and raised in Bloomington) is on the west side of the first floor, next to the fountain in front of Nordstrom.

Transit

In the lower level of the eastern parking ramp is the Mall of America station, the busiest transit hub in Minnesota with services to and from many destinations in the Minneapolis–Saint Paul metropolitan area. The Transit Station contains two stops on the Metro Transit network: the southern terminus of the METRO Blue Line (light rail) to Downtown Minneapolis via MSP Airport and Hiawatha Avenue (operated by Metro Transit), and the northern terminus of the METRO Red Line (BRT) to Apple Valley (operated by the Minnesota Valley Transit Authority). Both agencies also operate many local bus services to the Transit Station and many area hotels along with the Mystic Lake Casino Hotel offer free shuttles to their establishments.

The mall is not a park and ride facility, and overnight parking is banned to prevent passengers taking the train to the airport. Commuters are required to use the nearby 28th Avenue station's parking ramp. The station underwent a $25 million upgrade which was completed in October 2019.

Safety and security

Security personnel 
Behavior Detection Officers (BDOs) are trained extensively in Israel, each one going through at least 240 hours of training that includes communication techniques, first aid, defensive tactics, crisis intervention, terrorism awareness and rapid response. As Doug Reynolds, the former Security Director at the mall noted in a congressional testimony in 2008, BDOs are taught to "look for intent, rather than means. The objective is to focus on suspicious indicators in three categories: People, vehicles, and unattended items like backpacks, shopping bags, and suitcases." This methodology has prepared the mall for a variety of threats, both from terrorists and everyday criminals.

In 2010, it was noted that mall security officials were instructed to question or detain individuals exhibiting what they deemed "suspicious behavior". Signs of suspicious behavior included photographing air-conditioning ducts, or signs that a shopper was hiding something. At the time, some officials within the Bloomington Police Department worried that the mall's security methods may infringe on citizens' rights.

In 2011, NPR's All Things Considered and Morning Edition and PBS's NewsHour both aired programs documenting security abuses by the mall's security personnel. On December 31, 2013, members from the First Nations protest movement Idle No More attempted to repeat a successful Native-American round dance held at the mall in 2012, but failed after being stopped by mall security. Organizers of the dance, Patricia Shepard and Reyna Crow from Duluth were arrested on site for trespassing.

In January 2023, a man wearing a T-shirt emblazoned with the slogan Jesus saves was ordered to either take it off or leave the mall, security telling him, "Jesus is associated with religion and it is offending people. People have been offended."

Militant threat 
In February 2015, the al-Shabaab militant group also released a propaganda video calling for attacks on the Mall of America and other Western shopping centers. Although the group had never launched attacks in North America, security at the mall was tightened in response and the Department of Homeland Security issued a one-day alert to shoppers to remain vigilant.

Protests 
On December 21, 2014, thousands of protesters attended an unauthorized demonstration organized by Black Lives Matter in the mall's rotunda. The demonstration was in response to the shooting of Michael Brown in Ferguson, Missouri and the then recent jury decision not to prosecute the white officer in that case, as well as the death of Eric Garner of New York. In response to the demonstration, the Mall of America closed the areas of the mall around the rotunda. Police arrested 25 demonstrators. The Bloomington City Attorney, Sandra Johnson, pursued charges against the organizers, and the city is sought compensatory damages from some of the organizers for out-of-pocket costs the city incurred while paying overtime for additional security. In response to these charges, demonstrators have called for a boycott of the mall.

Plans for another Black Lives Matter demonstration at the Mall of America on December 23, 2015, prompted mall officials to file a restraining order against the movement's activists. Eight individual activists were sued in Hennepin County District Court. The mall's lawsuit would prohibit the defendants from demonstrating and require them to delete all of their posts to social media pertaining to the demonstration. The lawsuit additionally asked that the court jail Black Lives Matter activists unless they publicly announce that the demonstration is cancelled on their social media accounts. The American Civil Liberties Union of Minnesota called the mall's lawsuit an "improper prior restraint on speech" and an unconstitutional overreach.

Notable criminal incidents 
On April 12, 2019, a five-year-old was thrown from a third-story balcony by 24-year-old Emmanuel Deshawn Aranda of Minneapolis. The boy was in the hospital for over five months and eventually recovered. Aranda was sentenced to 19 years in prison in June of that year with the possibility for parole after 12 years served.

On December 31, 2021, a single gunshot was fired on the north side of the third floor of the mall. A patrolling Bloomington Police Department officer who heard the shot immediately notified mall security, who activated the mall's lockdown alarm. Responding officers found a man who had been shot in the leg when they arrived at the scene and later another injured person was found who appeared to have been grazed by the bullet. The first victim was transported to the hospital while the second was treated on the scene by paramedics and released. According to a statement by Deputy Chief Kim Clausen, she recommended that there was an "altercation" between two men that resulted in one shooting the other. After a thorough search of the mall by police and security officers, the lockdown was lifted approximately 40 minutes after it started and the mall closed for the rest of the day shortly thereafter. On January 3, 2022, an 18-year-old Roseville man was identified as they left the scene of the shooting with the shooter was arrested for aiding and abetting first-degree assault, and on January 4, police arrested the suspect on assault charges and in a subsequent search of the house found a gun.

On August 4, 2022, the mall was put under lockdown after two men fired gunshots during an altercation at the Nike store, then fled. Two-time NASCAR Cup Series champion Kyle Busch was in the mall with his family at the time; they were unharmed. The two alleged shooters were apprehended a week later in Chicago. They were detained shortly after stepping out of a barbershop. Three people were also arrested for allegedly aiding the shooters as they fled the scene and hid from authorities at a nearby Best Western hotel. Two of the suspects originated from Minneapolis, while the other three originated from Burnsville, all between the ages of 21 and 23.

On December 23, 2022, the mall was placed under lockdown after a "long-standing feud" led to the fatal shooting of a 19-year old male inside the Nordstrom department store. A bullet grazed a bystander's clothing resulting in only minor injuries.

In media
The Mall of America was used as a filming location for various movies and television shows, including:
D2: The Mighty Ducks (1994)
D3: The Mighty Ducks (1996)
The first episode of WCW Monday Nitro
Jingle All the Way (1996)
You're Invited to Mary-Kate & Ashley's Mall Party (1997)
Drop Dead Gorgeous (1999)
Mall Masters (2001)
Viva la Bam (2003–2006)
Mall Cops: Mall of America (2010)
The End of the Tour (2015)

The mall was also referenced in the series How I Met Your Mother during the episode "Slap Bet" as the reason why native Minnesotan Marshall Eriksen believed that Robin Scherbatsky would have been married in a mall; this is a reference to the Chapel of Love in the mall. The mall was the location of the premiere of Digimon: The Movie (2000).

See also

 American Dream Meadowlands, a similarly large shopping mall in New Jersey
 List of the world's largest shopping malls
 List of largest shopping malls in the United States
 Mall Cops: Mall of America

References

External links

Labelscar summary
Metro Transit: Mall of America Station
City Pages staff writer Matt Snyders spends one week in the Mall of America

Buildings and structures in Bloomington, Minnesota
Shopping malls established in 1992
Shopping malls in Hennepin County, Minnesota
Tourist attractions in Hennepin County, Minnesota
1992 establishments in Minnesota